Teignmouth Lido is an open-air heated public lido at Eastcliff Walk, Teignmouth, Devon, England.

Opened in 1976, Teignmouth Lido has a heated pool measuring  x . It is open to the public during the summer months and charges for admission. It is one of three outdoor pools operated by Teignbridge District Council, the others being at Buckfastleigh and Ashburton. A number of schemes have been proposed during the subsequent years to upgrade the lido and potentially give it a roof, but they have failed to gain funding.

In 2010 Teignbridge District Council published "A Vision for Teignmouth", a regeneration proposal document which suggested a number of possible futures for the Lido:

 Retaining the public pool on a reduced site while allowing the building of private apartments or a hotel on the remainder.
 Refurbishing the pool and permitting the development of a spa complex on the rest of the site.
 Relocating the pool to an alternative site in Teignmouth such as the Den or Lower Point.

The pool was shut in 2020 due to the COVID-19 pandemic in the United Kingdom, and also in 2021 due to the installation of a heat pump to reduce greenhouse gas emissions from the pool's heating system. In 2022 planning permission was granted for a solar photovoltaic system to be used in conjunction with a battery energy storage system and a pergola was built for the photovoltaics. The total cost of the conversion was over £800,000 and funding was provided by central government. Project delays meant that the Lido remained closed during 2022.

See also
History of lidos in the UK
Shoalstone Pool, a seawater lido in Brixham, Devon
Tinside Pool, a lido in Plymouth, Devon
The Rock Pool, Westward Ho! also in Devon

References

External links
Teignmouth Beach Surf Life Saving Club
Lidos in the UK

Lidos
Swimming venues in England
Buildings and structures in Devon
Teignmouth